Medina Haram Piazza Shading Umbrellas or Al-Masjid An-Nabawi Umbrellas are convertible umbrellas erected at the piazza of Al-Masjid an-Nabawi in Medina, Saudi Arabia. The shade of the umbrella is spread in the four corners, and the area covered by the shade extends to 143,000 square meters. These umbrellas are aimed to protect worshipers from the heat of the sun during prayer, as well as from the risk of slipping and falling in the event of rain. Similar structures are built at the square of the mosques worldwide. At Al-Masjid An-Nabawi, there are a total of 250 umbrellas.

Project
The concept was originally created by the King Abdullah bin Abdul Aziz, who ordered the construction of umbrellas for the squares of the mosque, which was overseen by the Custodian of the Two Holy Mosques. The project was completed in August 2010, which initially included the construction of 182 umbrellas aligning the pillars of the mosques at the square, and later 68 umbrellas were added in the eastern square, totaling 250 umbrellas. The project cost was 4.7 billion riyals.

Design
The Saudi Binladin Group has contracted the project's structural planning with the German architectural company SL Rasch GmbH Special and Lightweight Structures led by Mahmoud Bodo Rasch, who is credited for many architectural projects in the Middle East. From the beginning of the planning, the PTFE fabric was needed to meet the exceptional requirements, as any other fabric does not provide full protection from ultraviolet. The fabric is characterized by high tensile strength, wind strength, and its elasticity, chromatic stability, fire resistance, effective shading and suitable light penetration. The highly durable PTFE white fabric was developed by SEFAR Architecture specifically for the project. The shade is painted in white color due to the intensity of light, and because strong permeability can dazzle people under the umbrella, a sandy texture was chosen instead. In addition, the underside of the umbrellas was decorated with oriental motifs made of blue PTFE stripes.

Use of Advanced Composites 
Each single open umbrella structure of 25 x 25 metre spans an area of 625m2. As the components for each umbrella are so large and also have to withstand potentially extreme climatic conditions, the cladding needed to be made from advanced composites. Premier Composite Technologies LLC was commissioned to build and install the mosaic tiled, external claddings for all 250 units of foldable umbrellas. The arm claddings and cladding attachments were built from a lightweight composite sandwich structure of glass fibre epoxy resin laminate, providing high torsional stiffness. They were then fixed to the flexible umbrella arm systems. When closed, the arms cover the membrane while additional claddings on top of the arms form a prismatic casing to protect the folded Teflon membrane.

Gallery

See also
Fan vaulting
Awning
Passive cooling
Kucheh

References

Islamic architecture
Al-Masjid an-Nabawi
Umbrellas
Passive cooling